Noticastrum is a genus of South American flowering plants in the family Asteraceae.

 Species

References

Asteraceae genera
Astereae
Flora of South America